A number of units of measurement were used in Hungary to measure length, area, volume, and so on. The metric system was adopted in Hungary in 1874 and has been compulsory since 1876.

Unit before the metric system

The system before the metric system was the old Vienna system.

Length

Several units were used to measure length.  Some units are given below:

 mérföld – Mile,  láb, 
 rúd – Rod, 2 öl, 
 öl – Fathom, 10 láb, 
 kettőslépés – Double step, 6 láb, 
 lépés – Step, 3 láb, 
 rőf – Ell, 2 láb, 
 láb – Foot, 
 arasz – Span, 10 ujj, 

 tenyér – Palm, 4 ujj, 
 hüvelyk – Thumb, 1 ujj, 
 ujj – Finger,  láb, 

One arsin was equal to 23.01084 in and one stab was equal to 5.18565 ft.

Mass

One oka was equal from 2.78 to 3.082 lb.

Area

Several units were used to measure area.  Some units are given below:

1 hold = 4316 m2 = 1.0665 acre

1 meile2 = 6978 ha

Volume

A number of units were used to measure volume.  Some units are given below:

1 akó (eimer) = 54.30 l

1 halbe =  akó

1 icce =  akó

1 metzen = 62.53 L

1 akó = 62.53 L

One fass was equal to 52.545 gallons.  The value of eimer was varied from 15.03 (in Upper Hungary) to 19.37 (in Lower Hungary).

References

Hungarian culture
Hungary